Ju-Jitsu was contested as a demonstration sport at the 2009 Asian Indoor Games in Hanoi, Vietnam from 3 November to 4 November 2009. The competition took place at the Sóc Sơn Gymnasium.

Medalists

Duo

Men's fighting

Women's fighting

Medal table

Results

Duo

Men
4 November

Men's fighting

62 kg
4 November

69 kg
4 November

77 kg
4 November

85 kg
3 November

94 kg
3 November

+94 kg
3 November

Women's fighting

55 kg
3 November

62 kg
3 November

+70 kg
4 November

References

External links
 Official website

2009 Asian Indoor Games events
2009